Mongol dynasty can refer to:

Yuan dynasty
Borjigin dynasty
Barlas dynasty
Timurid dynasty

See also
Mongol khanate (disambiguation)